William Edward Zeuch was an American socialist, educator, and academic who is best known as a founder and first director of the Commonwealth College in Arkansas. This college is the most well known attempt in Arkansas at establishing a radical labor educational school.

Personal life 

Zeuch was born on April 19, 1892 in Strawberry Point Iowa.

He was first and foremost an American academic, holding many degrees from various institutions that he would apply in various educational positions. He held an A.B from Lenox College, a M.A. from Clark University, and a PhD from University of Wisconsin. Before serving as the Director of Commonwealth College (1923–31), Zeuch first taught Economics at Indiana University from 1917–18, and then at University of Illinois from 1922–23.

Commonwealth College 

William Zeuch co-founded the Commonwealth College and served as its first director from 1923 until he was ousted by an increasingly radical and ultimately self-destructive sect of the College in 1931.

In 1917, at Ruskin College in Florida, along with the husband and wife combination of Kate Richards O'Hare and Frank O'Hare, Zuech created the basis for a school that would focus on educating the future leaders of an emerging class of workers. Ruskin College stood as the model to be tweaked by Zuech and the O'Hares, who were strong followers of socialist Eugene Debs. 

Zuech’s personal philosophy was based on theoretical labor education and influenced the non-partisanship that was included in the mission of Commonwealth College. Despite this, in 1926, charges of communism fell down on Zuech and Commonwealth   and an FBI investigation was set into motion. FBI  Commissioner J. Edgar Hoover exonerated the school due to lack of evidence supporting the claims, but Zuech’s mission to keep a non-partisan, non factional, and uncontroversial education space would never fully be realized after being connected to the “Red” Communist ideas.

References 

1892 births
American educators
Year of death missing